In enzymology, a 2,4'-dihydroxyacetophenone dioxygenase is an enzyme that catalyzes the chemical reaction

2,4'-dihydroxyacetophenone + O2  4-hydroxybenzoate + formate

Thus, the two substrates of this enzyme are 2,4'-dihydroxyacetophenone and O2, whereas its two products are 4-hydroxybenzoate and formate.

This enzyme belongs to the family of oxidoreductases, specifically those acting on single donors with O2 as oxidant and incorporation of two atoms of oxygen into the substrate (oxygenases). The oxygen incorporated need not be derived from O2.  The systematic name of this enzyme class is 2,4'-dihydroxyacetophenone oxidoreductase (C-C-bond-cleaving). This enzyme is also called (4-hydroxybenzoyl)methanol oxygenase.  This enzyme participates in bisphenol a degradation.

References 

 

EC 1.13.11
Enzymes of unknown structure